La Tablada Rugby Club is a rugby union and field hockey club based in the city of Córdoba, Argentina. Founded in 1943 as a social institution, La Tablada started its sports activities in the 1950s.

History
First named "El Club de la Parroquia de La Tablada" it was originally a social club founded by members of La Tablada parish in Córdoba. Some members of this club were already playing rugby for Córdoba Athletic and decided to form their own team.

In 1954, Bamba Rugby Club was founded in the Vélez Sarsfield district of Córdoba and played its first game against Córdoba Athletic. 
After changing locations many times and looking for a place where establish its facilities, Bamba Rugby Club came back to La Tablada social club and the two decided to merge and become La Tablada Rugby Club in 1955.

Since 1955, La Tablada has become one of the most successful teams of cordobés rugby, winning the Torneo de Córdoba title 14 times, apart from 3 Torneo del Interior championships and a Nacional de Clubes title in 1999. La Tablada also takes part in the Torneo Regional, having won a championship in 2003. 

La Tablada's main rival is Tala.

In field hockey, the club is affiliated to amateur Córdoba Field Hockey Federation, where its teams compete.

Titles
Nacional de Clubes: 1
 1999
Torneo del Interior: 3
 2001, 2010, 2011
Torneo Regional del Centro: 1
 2003
Torneo de Córdoba (lower division): 16
 1961, 1963, 1965, 1966, 1978, 1987, 1988, 1991, 1994, 1997, 2000, 2001, 2003, 2006, 2011, 2012

References

External links

 

t
t
t
t